David Roy Davies (12 August 1928 – 14 July 2013) was a Welsh cricketer.  Davies was a right-handed batsman.  He was born at Llanelli, Carmarthenshire.  He was educated in his later early years at Cardiff University.

Davies made a single first-class appearance for Glamorgan in 1950 against Somerset.  In the match, he scored 7 runs in his only first-class innings.

Davies was an industrial chemist and fuel technologist who later worked for Unilever. Davies also played squash, a sport he represented Wales in.

Family
Davies had an older brother, Haydn, who played first-class cricket for Glamorgan and the Marylebone Cricket Club.  Both of their parents were killed during the Second World War, after which Haydn adopted Roy and became his legal father.  His nephew Andrew Davies played first-class cricket for Cambridge University and List-A cricket for the Combined Universities.

References

External links
Roy Davies at Cricinfo
Roy Davies at CricketArchive

1928 births
2013 deaths
Cricketers from Llanelli
Glamorgan cricketers
Welsh chemists
Welsh cricketers